KQEN (1240 AM) is a radio station  broadcasting a News Talk Information format. It is licensed to Roseburg, Oregon, United States. The station is currently owned by Brooke Communications and features programming from ABC Radio, ESPN Radio and Premiere Radio Networks.

References

External links
 Official Website
 

QEN
News and talk radio stations in the United States
Roseburg, Oregon